Breyell is a railway station located in Breyell, Germany. The station opened on 29 January 1866 is located on the Viersen–Venlo railway. The train services are operated by Eurobahn.

Train services
The following services currently call at the station:

Regional services  Venlo - Mönchengladbach - Düsseldorf - Wuppertal - Hamm

External links

References

Railway stations in North Rhine-Westphalia
Railway stations in Germany opened in 1866
1866 establishments in Prussia